Laevicardium laevigatum , or the egg cockle, is a species of bivalve mollusc in the family Cardiidae. It can be found along the Atlantic coast of North America, ranging from North Carolina to the West Indies.

References

Cardiidae
Molluscs described in 1758
Taxa named by Carl Linnaeus